The C Class are a class of diesel locomotive built by Clyde Engineering, Rosewater for the Victorian Railways in 1977–1978.

History

The C class were purchased by the Victorian Railways for heavy freight haulage. They are a variant of the WAGR L class (itself an Australianised EMD SD40) fitted with safety cabs. Initially, the first four were placed on the North East line to haul services from Melbourne to Albury while the latter six were put on the broad gauge to haul services on the Serviceton line. Following upgrades to the infrastructure, they were also able to operate on the Ballarat to Geelong line and from January 1982 through to Adelaide with the standard gauge units transferred to the broad gauge.

On 3 August 1979, engines C505 and 506 ran through to Adelaide for the first time as part of a trial of through-running, in place of the previous practice involving changing locomotives at the border. C505 led on the westbound trip with a trailing load of 1,755 tonnes and 506 led on the eastbound with 1,804 tonnes. A number of stop-and-start tests were undertaken on the Adelaide hills line to test the engines' ability to handle heavy loads, and running times were tested particularly between Tailem Bend and Mile End. New radio communication systems were also trialled between the driver and guard using fixed units in lieu of the earlier portable units. The trial was deemed a success, with through-running becoming a regular feature from 12 November. At the time a number of C Class engines were running on the standard gauge between Melbourne and Albury, and it was intended to recall these for broad gauge interstate work and have them replaced by locomotives from Australian National Railways.

In September 1988, two were transferred back to the standard gauge and began to operate services through to Sydney.

Following the Melbourne-Adelaide railway being closed for gauge conversion, all remaining broad gauge units were converted to standard gauge and operated services from Melbourne to Parkes until the converted line reopened in July 1995. All were transferred by V/Line to National Rail in June 1995.

Following the delivery of National Rail's NR class locomotives, the C class were put into storage at Junee Locomotive Depot in 1997 before being moved to Islington Railway Workshops, Adelaide. Unlike the other locomotives National Rail initially used, ownership of the C class passed to National Rail. In August 1999 two were repainted in National Rail livery and returned to service as Melbourne shunters.

The class was then sold with one going to Seymour Railway Heritage Centre and the other nine to Allco Rail with two leased to Pacific National and seven to Silverton Rail as the Cs class. Following the collapse of Allco Finance three were sold to Chicago Freight Car Leasing Australia and six to Greentrains in January 2008 with all resuming their original identities.

In April 2016, the six Greentrains units were sold to Southern Shorthaul Railroad. Having been in store at South Dynon Locomotive Depot, all were taken to the Lithgow State Mine Heritage Park & Railway with the last returned to service in August 2016. As of July 2021, all 10 class members are operational.

Class list

Model railways

HO Scale

As of January 2020, a few companies have done or are doing the C Class in HO Scale

Auspower (SDS Models) released their C Classes in 2019 with Numbers and Liveries as follows

C501 "George Brown" (VR), C506 (VR), C507 (VR), C504 (V/Line), C505 (V/Line), C509 (V/Line), C505 (National Rail), Cs1 (Silverton), Cs2 (Silverton), C507 (South Spur Rail Services), C508 (South Spur Rail Services), C509 (Cootes), C506 (Greentrains), C502 (CFCLA), C512 (Pacific National) (Fictional), VC545 (Freight Australia) (Fictional), 1507 (GWA) (Fictional), 5120 (ARG) (Fictional), FC513 (Freightlink) (Fictional), FQ515 (Qube) (Fictional), C504 (SSR Blue), C507 (SSR Blue), C510 (SSR Green) and C503 (SSR)

In Mid 2020, Auscision Models plans to release their own version of the C class with an option to have DCC with sound already fitted. Numbers and Liveries as follows

Victorian Railways Blue and Gold - C501 "George Brown", C504, C507 and C509

Victorian Railways Blue and Gold with Radio Equipped Stickers - C502, C505 and C506

V/Line Orange and Grey - C501 "George Brown". C503, C504, C506, C507 and C508

National Rail Orange and Grey - C505

Silverton Blue and Yellow - Cs4

South Spur Blue and Yellow - C508

Cootes Green and Yellow - C509

Greentrains Green and Yellow - C506

Southern Shorthaul Railroad Yellow and Black - C503

Southern Shorthaul Railroad Green - C510

Southern Shorthaul Railroad Blue - C507

Chicago Freight Car Leasing Australia Blue - C502

Gallery

References

External links

Clyde Engineering locomotives
Co-Co locomotives
Railway locomotives introduced in 1977
C class
Standard gauge locomotives of Australia
Broad gauge locomotives in Australia
Diesel-electric locomotives of Australia